The gastrointestinal hormones (or gut hormones) constitute a group of hormones secreted by enteroendocrine cells in the stomach, pancreas, and small intestine that control various functions of the digestive organs. Later studies showed that most of the gut peptides, such as secretin, cholecystokinin or substance P, were found to play a role of neurotransmitters and neuromodulators in the central and peripheral nervous systems.

Enteroendocrine cells do not form glands but are spread throughout the digestive tract. They exert their autocrine and paracrine actions that integrate gastrointestinal function.

Types
The gastrointestinal hormones can be divided into three main groups based upon their chemical structure.
 Gastrin–cholecystokinin family: gastrin and cholecystokinin
 Secretin family: secretin, glucagon, vasoactive intestinal peptide and gastric inhibitory peptide
 Somatostatin family
 Motilin family
 Substance P.

Ghrelin is a peptide hormone released from the stomach and liver and is often referred to as the "hunger hormone" since high levels of it are found in individuals that are fasting. Ghrelin agonistic treatments can be used to treat illnesses such as anorexia and loss of appetites in cancer patients. Ghrelin treatments for obesity are still under intense scrutiny and no conclusive evidence has been reached. This hormone stimulates growth hormone release.
Amylin controls glucose homeostasis and gastric motility

Glucose-dependent insulinotropic polypeptide possesses an acute influence on food intake through its effects on adipocytes

Oxyntomodulin plays a role in controlling acid secretion and satiation

See also
 Hormone, endocrine system
 Digestive system, gastrointestinal tract
 Peptide YY

Notes and references

External links
 Overview of Gastrointestinal Hormones - Colorado State University website

Endocrinology
Digestive system
Abdomen